Rashad Nabi Oghlu Nabiyev (born 1977) is an Azerbaijani politician serving as the Minister of Transport, Communications and High Technologies of Azerbaijan. He previously served as the chairman of the board and chief executive officer of Azercosmos.

Education 
 1994-2000 — Public Administration from Public Administration Academy under the auspices of President of the Republic of Azerbaijan (bachelor's and master's degrees).
 2000-2002 — East Carolina University, United States (Master of Science in Economics).
 2006 — Kennedy School of Government at Harvard University (program for Senior Executives in Public Financial Management).

Work 
 1997-2000 — employee of the Information Resources and Technologies Center and International Relations Department at the President's Office of the Republic of Azerbaijan.
 2002-2004 — employee of the Market Operations Department of the Central Bank of Azerbaijan.
 2004-2011 — head of Finance, Accounting and Economic Analysis Department at the Ministry of Communications and Information Technologies of Azerbaijan.
 Since 24 January 2011 — chairman of the board and chief executive officer of Azercosmos.
 2014 — by the Order of the President of Azerbaijan Rashad Nabiyev for services in the development of space industry in Azerbaijan was awarded with the Progress medal.
 2019 — by the Order of the President of Azerbaijan from 27 May 2019 Rashad Nabiyev was awarded with the jubilee medal dedicated to “The 100th anniversary of the Azerbaijan Democratic Republic (1918-2018)".

Links 
 Biography at azercosmos.az 
 Interview of Rashad Nabiyev to The Business Year (2015)
 Interview of Rashad Nabiyev to Via Satellite (2012)

References

1977 births
Living people
East Carolina University alumni
Azercosmos
21st-century Azerbaijani economists
Recipients of the Tereggi Medal
Recipients of the Azerbaijan Democratic Republic 100th anniversary medal